Central High School is a school located in Santurce barrio of San Juan, Puerto Rico.

The 1925-built building was listed on the U.S. National Register of Historic Places in 1987.

It is a three-story, U-shaped building with Spanish Renaissance architecture.

Its National Register nomination asserts that "Central High School is, for many reasons, the most important school structure built in Puerto Rico in the first decades of the XXth century."

It was built as part of a building program that also yielded the Ponce High School, built in 1915, and the Gautier Benítez High School in Caguas, built in 1924.

References

External links

 National Archives Catalog #131518310

National Register of Historic Places in San Juan, Puerto Rico
School buildings completed in 1925
Education in San Juan, Puerto Rico
School buildings on the National Register of Historic Places in Puerto Rico
1925 establishments in Puerto Rico
Spanish Revival architecture in Puerto Rico
Renaissance Revival architecture
Santurce, San Juan, Puerto Rico
High schools in Puerto Rico